Vosselaar is a municipality located in the Belgian province of Antwerp. The municipality only comprises the town of Vosselaar proper. In 2021, Vosselaar had a total population of 11,443. The total area is 11.85 km2.

There are three parishes: "Heieinde", Vosselaar "Dorp" and 't Looy. 't Looy is an upmarket residential area in the woods with a wide variety of large villas and landhouses. In this part of Vosselaar, many Dutch people have settled down, not only because Vosselaar is close to the Dutch border but also because Dutch people are fleeing high taxes and strict building regulations in the Netherlands.

Notable inhabitants
 Ajit Shetty, chairman of the board of directors and Managing Director of Janssen Pharmaceutica
 Paul Janssen (Turnhout, September 12, 1926 – Rome, November 11, 2003), founder and former CEO of Janssen Pharmaceutica
 , former president of the Board of Directors of Philips

References

External links

Municipalities of Antwerp Province
Populated places in Antwerp Province